Vitello tonnato is a Piedmontese dish of cold, sliced veal covered with a creamy, mayonnaise-like sauce that has been flavored with tuna.  It is served chilled or at room temperature, generally in the summertime, as the main course of an Italian meal or as "an exceedingly elegant antipasto for an elaborate dinner." It is also very popular, by inheritance, in Argentina, Uruguay and Paraguay, where it is known by its original name in Piedmontese dialect Vitel tonnè, (spelled Vitel Toné or Thoné in Argentina) and considered a traditional Christmas dish.

It is prepared at least a day or more in advance by braising or simmering a piece of veal from the back leg called Eye Round, which is then cut into thin, individual servings.  For the sauce, originally fresh white tuna (in most restaurants canned tuna is used today to reduce cost and preparation time) is simmered until fully cooked in white wine, cider vinegar, white onion and garlic, and then puréed with a mix of olive and vegetable oil and egg yolks in an electric blender or food processor to form a thick mayonnaise. For the mayonnaise a variety of seasonings can be used, including anchovies, cayenne pepper, capers and lemon juice. The thick, smooth purée is then somewhat thinned with a little water and cooking liquid from the veal and a few capers are stirred in. Some of the sauce is spread out on a serving platter and the cold slices of veal are arranged in a single layer on top. The rest of the sauce is then poured over the veal so that it is, generally, completely covered.  The dish is allowed to refrigerate for a period up to 5 days to fully develop the flavor.

See also
List of Italian dishes
List of veal dishes
Italian cuisine
Argentine cuisine

References

Further reading

Cuisine of Piedmont
Veal dishes
Argentine cuisine
Tuna dishes
Christmas food